Robin Christian Salo (born 13 October 1998) is a Finnish professional ice hockey defenceman for the Bridgeport Islanders of the American Hockey League (AHL) as a prospect to the New York Islanders of the National Hockey League (NHL).

Playing career
He was selected by the New York Islanders in the second round, 46th overall, of the 2017 NHL Entry Draft.

On 26 February 2015, at the age of 16, Salo made his Liiga debut playing with Vaasan Sport during the 2014–15 season.

Following the 2017–18 season, after three Liiga campaigns with Vaasan Sport, Salo left at the conclusion of his contract to sign a two-year deal with fellow Liiga outfit, SaiPa, on 13 April 2018.

In the midst of the 2020–21 season, while leading the Swedish club, Örebro HK of the Swedish Hockey League (SHL), in assists and scoring from the blueline, Salo was signed to a two-year, entry-level contract with the New York Islanders on 13 February 2021. He was reassigned to continue his tenure with Örebro HK for the remainder of the season.

In the  season, Salo was recalled from AHL affiliate, the Bridgeport Islanders and made his NHL debut with New York on 20 November 2021, which coincidentally was also the first ever game played at UBS Arena. He recorded his first NHL point, a primary assist on a second period power play goal, on 16 December in a home game against the Boston Bruins. Salo’s later notched his first NHL goal came on 18 January 2022 in Philadelphia against the Flyers.

Career statistics

Regular season and playoffs

International

References

External links
 

1998 births
Living people
Bridgeport Islanders players
Finnish ice hockey defencemen
Kokkolan Hermes players
New York Islanders draft picks
New York Islanders players
Örebro HK players
SaiPa players
Sportspeople from Espoo
Vaasan Sport players